Albert is the debut studio album of the Texas noise rock band Ed Hall, released in 1988 by Boner Records. The album takes its name from Albert Leblanc, the artist who drew the illustrations for the record sleeve and booklet.

Track listing

Personnel
Adapted from the Albert liner notes.

Ed Hall
 Gary Chester – electric guitar, vocals
 Larry Strub – bass guitar, vocals
 Kevin Whitley – drums, vocals

Production and additional personnel
 Brian Beattie – production, bagpipes (1), accordion (7)
 Albert Leblanc – illustrations
 Mike Stewart – engineering

Release history

References

External links 
 

1988 debut albums
Ed Hall (band) albums
Boner Records albums